Athri (Known as Athari) is a village located in Runni Saidpur block, Sitamarhi district, Bihar, India. It is situated on the bank of the Lakhandei River.

Origin of the name
The name of the village is derived from Atharva Veda.

Geography
Athari is also a Panchayat along with the village. It is managed by Gram panchayat Athri.

Transport
The nearest railway junction is Muzaffarpur Junction railway station. With the start of the railway line between Muzaffapur and Sitamadhi, the nearest railway station has become Runni Saidpur, which is about 5 kilometers away.

The nearest airport is Jay Prakas Narayan International Airport, Patna at a distance of over 100Km

References

Villages in Sitamarhi district